Chazal or Ḥazal, an acronym for the Hebrew "Ḥakhameinu Zikhronam Liv'rakha" ("Our Sages, may their memory be blessed"), refers to all Jewish sages of the Mishna, Tosefta and Talmud eras, spanning from the times of the final 300 years of the Second Temple of Jerusalem until the 7th century CE, or  250 BCE –  625 CE.

Rabbinical eras; eras of the Halakha

Chazal are generally divided according to their era and the main writing done in that era:
 Soferim ("scribes"): Sages from before the era of Ezra the scribe until the Zugot era, including the men of the Great Assembly. This era stretches from the Matan Torah ("giving of the Law"; Moses receiving the Torah on Biblical Mount Sinai), to the Halakha ("traditions") era, including the times of Simeon the Just.
 Zugot ("pairs"): Five pairs (zugot) of sages from consecutive generations, who lived during a period of around 100 years towards the end of the Second Temple era. (142 BCE –  40 BCE)
 Tannaim ("teachers"): Refers to the sages of the Mishnah, who lived in the Land of Israel until 220 CE. In addition to the Mishnah, their writings were preserved in the Midrash. Key figures among the Tannaim include Hillel the Elder, Rabbi Akiva, and Judah haNasi.
 Amoraim ("expounders"): Refers to the sages of the Talmud who were active during the end of the era of the sealing of the Mishnah, and until the times of the sealing of the Talmud (220 CE – 500 CE). The Amoraim sages were active in two areas, the Land of Israel, and Babylon. In addition to the Babylonian Talmud and the Jerusalem Talmud, their writings were preserved in midrashs such as Midrash Rabba.
 Savoraim ("reasoners"): Refers to the sages of Beth midrash (Torah study places) in Babylon from the end of the era of the Amoraim (5th century) and until the beginning of the era of the Geonim (from the end of the 6th century or the midst of the 7th century).

Chazal's authority
Until the end of the Savoraim era, Chazal had the authority to comment on the Torah according to the Talmudical hermeneutics standards required by the Law given to Moses at Sinai, sometimes even expounding a word or phrase outside its plain and ordinary sense. Nowadays in Orthodoxy, this authority is not delegated to the current generation's sages, and thus the Torah can not be commentated on, in matters concerning the halakha ("Jewish Law"), if it contradicts Chazal's commentary.

Until the middle of the Tannaim era, when there was a Sanhedrin (a High Court of Jewish law), Chazal had also the authority to decree restrictions and to enact new religious regulations, in any matter they saw fit, concerning issues that were not included in the written Torah, or were not delivered at Mount Sinai. These rabbinical mitzvot ("commandments") include the holidays of Purim and Hanukkah, the laws of muktzeh ("set-aside items") on Shabbat, the ritual washing of one's hands (netilat yadayim) before eating bread, the construction of eruvim (liminal gateways), and the institution of the current schedule of daily prayer services – shacharit (morning prayer), mincha (afternoon prayer), and ma'ariv (evening prayer).

See also
 Jewish commentaries on the Bible

References

External links
Wiktionary: Chazal

 
Acronyms
Talmud concepts and terminology